The Town of Narrogin was a local government area of Western Australia for the town of Narrogin in the Wheatbelt region of Western Australia,  south-east of the capital, Perth along Great Southern Highway. It amalgamated with the Shire of Narrogin in 2016, with the new entity retaining that name.

History
On 13 April 1906, the Municipality of Narrogin came into being. On 1 July 1961, it became a Town under the Local Government Act 1960.  On 1 July 2016, it amalgamated with the Shire of Narrogin. The new entity retained the designation of Shire.

Town council
At the time of amalgamation, the town had nine councillors and no wards.

Population

See also
 Narrogin, Western Australia
 Shire of Narrogin

References

External links
 

Narrogin
Narrogin
Narrogin
Narrogin, Western Australia